Seyyed Nabi (also Romanized as Seyyed Nabī) is a village in Elhayi Rural District, in the Central District of Ahvaz County, Khuzestan Province, Iran. At the 2006 census, its population was 298, in 45 families.

References 

Populated places in Ahvaz County